The Peeters II Government (Regering-Peeters II) was the Flemish Government formed following the 2009 Flemish Parliament election. The cabinet consisted of a coalition of the Christian democratic CD&V, the social democratic sp.a and the nationalist N-VA. The largest opposition parties in the Flemish Parliament were far-right Vlaams Belang and liberal Open Vld.

Composition
The Peeters II Government consists of the following nine ministers:

See also
 Flanders in Action
 Di Rupo Government (Belgian federal government)

References
 Vlaamse Regering, krispeeters.be
 vlaamseregering.be
 

Politics of Flanders